Ruth Abrams (1912 - 12 March 1986) was a Jewish-American painter.

Personal
Ruth Davidson Abrams was born in Brooklyn, New York. At 19, she was married to urban planner Charles Abrams, and studied at Columbia University.

Professional
From 1965 to 1966, Ruth Abrams was the art director at the Research Association of The New School, and also lectured at the Parsons The New School for Design. Abrams is known for outer-space painting, such as, ''There Are Unknown Elements in the Universe as Old as Mankind'' (1962).  She also participated in art classes led by influential artists, including Alexander Archipenko and William Zorach, recognized for their use of abstraction in painting and sculpture.

As a painter, she belonged to the New York School. After her death, a critic from The New York Times remarked that she was "a woman unfairly neglected in a macho era." Her papers are held at the Yeshiva University Museum and the Smithsonian Archives of American Art.

Abrams worked with William Zorach, Alexander Archipenko, John D. Graham, and others.

Exhibitions
An exhibition of Abrams work was held from July 14 to August 26, 1986, following her death, at the Grey Art Gallery and Study Center in New York City. A solo exhibition entitled: "Microcosms: Ruth Abrams, Abstract Expressionist" from August 12, 2012‐January 6, 2013 at the Yeshiva University Museum promoted itself as the first solo exhibition of Abrams works. Many of the canvases in the exhibit were shown for the first time.

Publications 
Abrams provided the illustrations for Ekistics, Athens, Greece & Arena-Interbuild (London, Eng., 1967).

See also
 List of artists from Brooklyn

References

External links
Ruth Abrams, askART

1912 births
1986 deaths
Artists from Brooklyn
Modern artists
American women painters
Columbia University alumni
The New School faculty
Parsons School of Design faculty
Painters from New York City
20th-century American painters
20th-century American women artists
American women academics